Harry Boardman (1930–1987) was an English folk singer who was born in Failsworth, Lancashire. He sang both unaccompanied and accompanying himself on the Anglo concertina or banjo. "Boardman has specialised in the lore, songs and dialect poems of his native Lancashire. A fine singer, his recorded and printed work has done much to preserve the otherwise ignored aspects of his local tradition."—Fred Woods. He was active as a folk singer and collector of Lancashire folklore from the late 1950s with some collaboration from his wife Lesley. In 1991 the Harry Boardman Memorial Trust was established to increase public awareness of traditional music and related arts, including the folk music of the British Isles and local traditions of North West England. Harry appeared regularly, together with Dave Hillery and Terry Whelan at the Wayfarer's Folk Club, at various locations, including the Pack Horse Hotel in Bridge Street, Manchester from the late 1950s. Boardman was a folk club organiser from 1954 until the year he died; the home of his club in the 1970s and 1980s was the Unicorn Hotel in Church Street, Manchester. His interest in the songs of working folk came from his socialist beliefs.

Publications
Folk Songs & Ballads of Lancashire; compiled and edited by Harry & Lesley Boardman. London & New York: Oak Publications, 1973 
Manchester Ballads: thirty-five facsimile street ballads; selected and edited by Harry Boardman & Roy Palmer. Manchester: City of Manchester Education Committee, 1983

Discography
Boardman's recordings:
A Lancashire Mon, Topic Records (1973)
The Bonnie Pit Laddie, Topic Records (1975) (with The High Level Ranters and Dick Gaughan)
Golden Stream, AK Records (1978)
Personal Selection (1986)
Personal Choice, Cock Robin Music (2008)

Compilations
New Voices (with the Watersons & Maureen Craik), Topic Records (1965)
Deep Lancashire (with the Oldham Tinkers et al.), Topic Records (1968; 1997)
Owdham Edge (with the Oldham Tinkers et al.), Topic Records (1970)
Trans Pennine (with Dave Hillery), Topic Records (1971)
Steam Ballads (with Jon Raven et al.), Broadside (1977)
The Iron Muse (with Louis Killen et al.), Topic Records (1993)
 Only features on the CD version

 Three Score and Ten Topic Records (2009) 
The Hand Loom Weaver's Lament from Deep Lancashire is track ten on the sixth CD.

References

External links
Harry Boardman documentary; memories please; Mudcat Café
Terry Whelan; Mudcat Café

1930 births
1986 deaths
English folk singers
People from Failsworth
20th-century English singers
Topic Records artists
Musicians from the Metropolitan Borough of Oldham